Rockwood R-VI School District is a public school district headquartered in Eureka, Missouri, serving students in St. Louis County.
The Rockwood School District is St. Louis County's largest public school system, serving 22,268 students.

There are nineteen elementary schools, six middle schools, and five high schools in the district, with an average of 19 students per classroom teacher. There are 3,318 staff as of October 2012.

Covering  in parts of western St. Louis County and northern Jefferson County, Rockwood serves approximately 141,000 residents in over 53,000 households.  Eight distinct communities are within Rockwood's boundaries, including all or parts of Ballwin (pop. 30,404), Chesterfield (pop. 47,484), Clarkson Valley (pop. 2,632), Ellisville (pop. 9,133), Eureka (pop. 10,759), Fenton (pop. 4,022), Wildwood (pop. 35,517), and Winchester (pop. 1,547).

Schools

High schools
 Eureka High School
 Lafayette High School
 Marquette High School
 Rockwood Summit High School
 Individualized Learning Center

Middle schools

Crestview Middle School
Crestview Middle School is a middle school in Clarkson Valley, Missouri. It is housed in the building formerly used by Lafayette High School, another school within Rockwood District, and is Rockwood's largest middle school. The mascot is Hector the Trojan. Most of its students matriculate to Marquette High School, but some go on to Lafayette High School. The feeder schools are Ellisville Elementary, Kehrs Mill Elementary, Westridge Elementary, and Wild Horse Elementary. Crestview is home to 1,239 students and over 100 teachers.

LaSalle Springs Middle School
LaSalle Springs Middle School is a middle school in Wildwood, Missouri. Built halfway through the 1993 school year, Lasalle Springs enrolled 881 students in the 2018–19 school year. Students enrolling in LaSalle go on to attend Eureka High School.

At LaSalle, the average number of years of experience for teachers is 14.8 years. 98.4% of teachers have regular certificates, and 83.2% have advanced degrees.

Rockwood South Middle School
Rockwood South Middle School is a middle school in Fenton, Missouri. Rockwood South enrolled 948 students in the 2018–19 school year. Its alumni advance to Rockwood Summit High School.

Rockwood Valley Middle School
Rockwood Valley Middle School is a middle school in Wildwood, Missouri. The school was established in 1992. It enrolled 666 students in the 2018–19 school year, and 710 in the 2020–21 school year. Rockwood Valley alumni attend Lafayette High School. The average number of years of experience for teachers is 15.1 years. 78.0% of teachers have advanced degrees. The proportional attendance rate is 90.8. The ratio of students to regular classroom teachers is 15:1.

Selvidge Middle School
Morgan Selvidge Middle School is a middle school in Ballwin. The school was established in 1968. Its namesake is Morgan Selvidge, who was superintendent of the school district during the years of 1949–1970. In 2008, the school received an award called Recognized ASCA Model Program (RAMP) from the American School Counselor Association. It is Missouri's second school to receive this recognition. As of 2018–19, the school has an enrollment of 693 students in grades 6–8. There is 48 teachers on staff. Students who attend Selvidge Middle School matriculate to Marquette High School.

Wildwood Middle School
Wildwood Middle School is a middle school in Wildwood, Missouri. Students are sourced almost equally from Fairway Elementary, Green Pines Elementary, and from Pond Elementary. In the 2018–19 school year it enrolled 647 students. Approximately two-thirds of its students attend Eureka High School, and approximately one-third of them attend Lafayette High School.

Elementary schools
 Babler Elementary School
 Ballwin Elementary School
 Blevins Elementary School
 Bowles Elementary School
 Chesterfield Elementary School
 Ellisville Elementary School
 Eureka Elementary School
 Fairway Elementary School
 Geggie Elementary School
 Green Pines Elementary School
 Kehrs Mill Elementary School
 Kellison Elementary School
 Pond Elementary School
 Ridge Meadows Elementary School
 Stanton Elementary School
 Uthoff Valley Elementary School
 Westridge Elementary School
 Wild Horse Elementary School
 Woerther Elementary School

Early Childhood Centers
 Early Childhood Center at Clarkson Valley
 Early Childhood Center at Vandover Campus

Special Campuses 

 CCL (Center for Creative Learning)
 Located in Ellisville, Missouri. This is a center for gifted learning, normally occupied by elementary students.

Notable alumni 

 David Freese, MLB player, graduated from Lafayette High School in 2001.
 Ryan Howard, MLB player, graduated from Lafayette High School in 1998.
 Nikolas Schiller, prominent map artist, graduated from Marquette High School.
 Michael Johnson, MMA fighter, graduated from Marquette High School.
 Dan Connolly, NFL player, graduated from Marquette High School.
 Maurice Alexander, NFL player, graduated from Eureka High School.
 Cam Janssen, NHL player, graduated from Eureka High School.
 Kevin Donahue, NASCAR driver, graduated from Lafayette High School in 2013.
 Kyle Donahue, NASCAR driver, graduated from Lafayette High School in 2018.

References

External links

School districts in Missouri
Education in St. Louis County, Missouri
Educational institutions with year of establishment missing